Marie-Paule Blé (born 6 July 1998) is a French taekwondo practitioner. 

She won a bronze medal in middleweight at the 2019 World Taekwondo Championships, after being defeated by Lee Da-bin in the semifinal.

She also won one of the bronze medals in her event at the 2022 European Taekwondo Championships held in Manchester, United Kingdom.

References

External links

1998 births
Living people
French female taekwondo practitioners
Medalists at the 2019 Summer Universiade
Universiade medalists in taekwondo
Universiade bronze medalists for France
World Taekwondo Championships medalists
European Taekwondo Championships medalists
20th-century French women
21st-century French women